Pattan Assembly constituency is one of the 87 constituencies of the Jammu and Kashmir Legislative Assembly of union territory of Jammu and Kashmir. Pattan is also part of Baramulla Lok Sabha constituency.

Members of Legislative Assembly

Election results

2014

See also
 Pattan
 List of constituencies of Jammu and Kashmir Legislative Assembly

References

Assembly constituencies of Jammu and Kashmir
Baramulla district